Matěj Klíma (born 24 March 1999) is a Czech handball player for HC Dukla Prague and the Czech national team.

He represented the Czech Republic at the 2020 European Men's Handball Championship.

References

1999 births
Living people
Czech male handball players
People from Ivančice
Sportspeople from the South Moravian Region